David McLeish (born 26 July 1975) is a former Scottish rugby union player who played for Glasgow Rugby, now Glasgow Warriors at the number 8 position.

Rugby Union career

Amateur career

McLeish broke into the Kelso RFC first team when still a schoolboy.

He moved through to Glasgow to study Product Design engineering at the University of Strathclyde.

In Glasgow, McLeish first joined the amateur club Glasgow Hutchesons Aloysians until 1994 when he won a place at West of Scotland

Professional career

He shared a flat with West of Scotland and Glasgow Warriors teammates Guy Perrett and Gordon Bulloch. All three players were called up by the fledgling professional Glasgow side. McLeish was a regular in the Glasgow side for 2 years and played in European competition for the club throughout his time there.

As the No. 8 named for Warriors first match as a professional team - against Newbridge in the European Challenge Cup - McLeish has the distinction of being given Glasgow Warrior No. 8 for the provincial side.

When not playing for Glasgow, McLeish played the rest of the season with West of Scotland.

International career

As a schoolboy at Kelso High School McLeish represented Scotland Schoolboys at international level in 1993.

Business career

On the merger of the Scottish professional teams from four to two - involving Glasgow merging with the Caledonia Reds for the season 1998-99 - McLeish left professional rugby. He then moved into industry.

References

External links
 European Professional Club Rugby profile

1975 births
Living people
Rugby union players from Glasgow
Scottish rugby union players
Glasgow Warriors players
Rugby union number eights
West of Scotland FC players
Glasgow Hutchesons Aloysians RFC players
Kelso RFC players